RusLine (Aviakompanija «RusLajn») is a regional airline from Russia, which operates mostly domestic regional flights, as well as holiday charters. Its headquarters are located in the Omega Plaza (Омега Плаза) business centre in Moscow, Russia.

History

The company was founded in 1999 as Aerotex Airlines and was originally based at Sheremetyevo International Airport. In March 2013, it was renamed to today's RusLine, which coincided with a move to Vnukovo International Airport shortly after.

On 1 April 2010, RusLine acquired the assets and brand name of bankrupt Air Volga. This included six Bombardier CRJ200 aircraft, and Air Volga's base at Volgograd International Airport.

Originally, the airline operated several ageing Soviet-built aircraft. The first Western airliner, a 50-seat Bombardier CRJ100, was introduced with RusLine in February 2008. Over the following years, further planes of that type (all of which had been acquired second-hand) were added. In April 2012, RusLine took delivery of two larger Airbus A319 aircraft formerly owned by easyJet in order to address the growing demand for charter flights.

Route network

, RusLine operates scheduled flights to the following destinations.

Fleet

Current fleet
, the RusLine fleet consists of the following aircraft:

Historic fleet
Over the years, the following aircraft types were operated:

Accidents and incidents

On 20 June 2011, 47 people died in the crash of Flight 243. The aircraft involved, a Tupolev Tu-134 (registered RA-65691) had been leased by RusLine from RusAir and was approaching Petrozavodsk Airport, completing a flight from Moscow-Domodedovo. Due to poor visibility conditions, the pilots were unaware that they descended too rapidly, so that the aircraft struck trees and impacted on a highway. There were five survivors.

References

External links

Official website 

Airlines of Russia
Companies based in Moscow
Airlines established in 1999
1999 establishments in Russia
Russian brands